Baxter Black (January 10, 1945 – June 10, 2022) was an American cowboy poet and veterinarian. He wrote over 30 books of poetry, fiction—both novels and children's literature—and commentary, selling over two million books, CDs, and DVDs.

Biography 
Black was born in Brooklyn Naval Hospital, Brooklyn, New York, but grew up in Las Cruces, New Mexico. In high school, he became the Future Farmers of America (FFA) president, the senior class president, and lettered in wrestling one year. He began riding bulls in rodeos while in high school, and continued riding throughout college. Black received his undergraduate degree at New Mexico State University, and completed veterinary school at Colorado State University, graduating in 1969. He was a practicing veterinarian from 1969 to 1982, specializing in large animals, such as cows and horses. During the last two years of his veterinary career, Black gained popularity through public speaking with over 250 appearances. After this, his career as a poet began. Black also hosted the public television series Baxter Black and Friends.

He wrote a column, spoke on the radio, and had short segments on RFD-TV and The Cowboy Channel. He resided in Benson, Arizona, with his wife, Cindy Lou, where they had no cell phone, television, or fax machine. One of his philosophies of life claims: "In spite of all the computerized, digitalized, high-tech innovations of today, there will always be a need for a cowboy."  When asked what made him decide to become a cowboy, he said, "You either are one, or you aren't. You never have to decide."

In late 2021, Black retired from writing and speaking engagements because of health issues. Black's wife, Cindy Lou, reported on January 15, 2022, that he was in hospice care. His son-in-law explained, however, that the hospice consisted of a home health care worker checking on Black every few days because of various medical issues.

Black died from leukemia on June 10, 2022, at his residence in Benson, Arizona, aged 77.

Radio 
Black's radio career began as a chance occurrence. During a news-worthy local event, he submitted some of his work to a radio station. Black specified in an interview, "It was the year Yellowstone caught on fire, 1988. We were listening and they didn't have any coverage to speak of, and it was a huge deal in our life. It was a huge deal in Colorado (where I lived) and the sky smelled like smoke and I had this big tumultuous poem about range fire... So I sent them this.  I just sent it to "Public Radio" in Washington D.C.  And two or three days later I get a call back."

Baxter was a regular commentator for 20 years on NPR beginning in the early '80s, he was a regular commentator for National Public Radio's Morning Edition. Baxter Black on Monday, the weekly syndicated radio program, was on the air since 1989, and his weekly syndicated column, On the Edge of Common Sense, was carried by more than 150 publications.

Bibliography

See also

 Waddie Mitchell
 Red Steagall
 Will Rogers
 John R. Erickson
 Kinky Friedman

References

External links
 Official website
 Home on the Range with Baxter Black
 Cowboy Poet Appreciative Of Rural Life
 Parade Offers More Than A Whiff Of The Old West
 Baxter Black on IMDb
 
  Legacy of a Rodeo Man with Baxter Black

1945 births
2022 deaths
Cowboys
Poets from New Mexico
American veterinarians
Male veterinarians
Cowboy poets
People from Benson, Arizona
Writers from Arizona
Writers from Brooklyn